Toni Porkka (born February 4, 1970) is a Finnish former professional ice hockey player who played in the Finnish SM-liiga, German Deutsche Eishockey Liga (DEL), and the American Hockey League (AHL). He was drafted in the ninth round of the 1990 NHL Entry Draft by the Philadelphia Flyers and played three seasons with the Flyers top minor league affiliate at the time, the AHL's Hershey Bears. He spent most of his professional career in Europe, playing nine seasons in the SM-liiga with Rauman Lukko and six seasons in the DEL with the Frankfurt Lions and Kölner Haie. He is currently the Hockey Director for the Valley Forge Minutemen of the Atlantic Youth Hockey League.

Career statistics

References

External links

1970 births
Living people
Finnish ice hockey defencemen
Frankfurt Lions players
Hershey Bears players
Kölner Haie players
Lukko players
People from Rauma, Finland
Philadelphia Flyers draft picks
Sportspeople from Satakunta